Acupalpus alumnus is an insect-eating ground beetle of the genus Acupalpus.

References 

alumnus
Beetles described in 1946